Tzere (also spelled Tsere, Tzeirei, Zere, Zeire, Ṣērê; modern , , sometimes also written ; formerly  ṣērê) is a Hebrew niqqud vowel sign represented by two horizontally-aligned dots "◌ֵ" underneath a letter. In modern Hebrew, tzere is pronounced the same as segol and indicates the phoneme /e/, which is the same as the "e" sound in the vowel segol and is transliterated as an "e".  There was a distinction in Tiberian Hebrew between segol and Tzere.

Usage
Tzere is usually written in these cases:
 In final stressed closed syllables: מַחְשֵׁב (computer), סִפֵּר (he told; without niqqud סיפר). Also in final syllables closed by guttural letters with an added furtive patach: מַטְבֵּעַ (coin), שוֹכֵחַ (forgetting). Notable exceptions to this rule are:
 The personal suffixes ־תֶם (2 pl. m.), ־תֶן (2 pl. f.), ־כֶם (2 pl. m.), ־כֶן (2 pl. f.), ־הֶם (3 pl. m.), ־הֶן (3 pl. f.) are written with segol. (But the words הֵם (they m.), הֵן (they f.) are written with Tzere.)
 The words אֱמֶת (truth), בַּרְזֶל (iron), גַּרְזֶן (axe), כַּרְמֶל (Carmel, gardenland), עֲרָפֶל (fog) are written with segol.
 The word בֵּן (son, boy) is written with tzere in the absolute state, but with segol in the construct state: בֶּן־. In the Bible this rule also applies to other words which end in tzere, when they are written with maqaf.
 In non-final, unstressed open syllables: עֵנָב (grape), תֵּבָה (chest, ark; without niqqud תיבה).
 In the first (stressed) syllable of about 70 segolate words, among them חֵלֶק (part), סֵפֶר (book), עֵדֶן (Eden). In other – much more numerous – segolate words the first  sound is a segol.
 In final open syllables, when the mater lectionis is yod (י) or aleph (א‎): בְּנֵי־ (sons of), מוֹצֵא (finding). When the mater lectionis is he (ה), the vowel sign is usually segol, but tzere is written in the imperative and absolute infinitive forms of the verb, in nouns in construct state, and in the base form of several other nouns (see below for details).

In declension tzere sometimes changes to other vowels or to shva. The full rules for these changes were formulated the Academy of the Hebrew Language.

In modern Hebrew there are words which are homophones and homographs in spelling without niqqud, but are written differently with niqqud, the difference being segol and tzere. For example, עֶרֶב evening and עֵרֶב weft are both pronounced  and written ערב without niqqud (these words also have different etymology).

Writing tzere with and without matres lectionis

Tzere can be written with and without matres lectionis. The most prominent mater lectionis for tzere is Yod, and in some cases it is used with the letters aleph and he.

Standard spelling rules mandate only one way to spell every word with or without the Yod after tzere. Although in standard modern pronunciation the sound of tzere with or without the Yod is the same, it may change the word's meaning in a written text (see below).

Standard usage without Yod
Tzere can be written by itself without mater lectionis, in which case it is called tzere ḥaser ("lacking tzere"), for example in the word  (wreath). In this case, in text without niqqud the vowel  is usually not written at all: זר. According to the standardized Hebrew spelling the letter Yod is sometimes written in texts without niqqud, when there is a grammatical reason for it; for example, the verb  (she will be absent) is written without Yod in texts with niqqud, but the Yod is written in a text without niqqud: .

Standard usage with Yod
Tzere with Yod is called "full tzere". When a full tzere is written in text with niqqud, the letter Yod must be written in text without niqqud. The main cases for writing the tzere with Yod are these:

 Tzere is written with Yod to indicate the plural number of declined words, for example  means our product and  means our products; the standard pronunciation is the same: .
 Tzere is written with Yod in words in which the Yod is a part of the root:
 Nouns, for example בֵּיצָה (egg), root ב־י־צ‎; זֵיתִים (olives, the plural of זַיִת), root ז־י־ת‎, מֵידָע (information), root י־ד־ע. Tzere is also traditionally written with Yod in several other words, the roots of which are rarely used productively to form other words, among them פְּסֵיפָס (mosaic), קֵיסָם (sliver) and the word "tzere" itself – צֵירֵי.
 Verbs, in which the last letter of the root is he (ל״ה), which is by convention treated as interchangeable with Yod, for example נִבְנֵית (being built f.), root ב־נ־ה (or ב־נ־י). In Arabic the corresponding verbs are written with ʾalif maqṣūra, which represents a similar interchange of the letters yāʾ (ي) and ʾalif (ا).
 Some verbs in which the first letter of the root is Yod (פ״י‎), for example הֵיטִיב (he did well), root י־ט־ב.
 In standard spelling without niqqud Yod is written to represent the [e] sound in words formed in the pattern heCCeC (הֶקְטֵל), in which the first and the second consonants of the root merge, even though the vowel there is not tzere, but seggol, for example הֶשֵּׂג (achievement; root נ־שׂ־ג, without niqqud הישג).

Nonstandard usage of Yod to represent tzere
In texts with full niqqud – mostly poetry, religious and children books – tzere is usually written in accordance with the rules mandated by the Academy. The Academy defined some cases in which a Yod is added to texts without niqqud to signify an  sound, but in common usage Yod is often written or not written contrary to the standard.

Some notable common deviations from the standard in which a Yod is added include:
 Some words are often written with Yod in texts without niqqud, even though the Yod is not a part  of the root and is not written in a text with niqqud. For example: מֵמַד (dimension), מֵרַב (Merab, most), שֵׂעָר (hair) are often written מימד‎, מירב and שיער, even though the standard spelling without niqqud is ממד‎, מרב‎, שער. This goes further as the Yod is retained  in declined forms of the  word, which aren't written with tzere at all, but with  shva; for example, the word שְׂעָרוֹת (hairs) is frequently written שיערות, although the vowel of the ש is shva (the standard spelling is שערות).
 Words in the pattern CəCeCa (קְטֵלָה) are often written with a Yod, even though it is not the standard. Examples include בְּרֵכָה (pool), גְּנֵבָה (theft), שְׂרֵפָה (burning), which are often written בריכה‎, גניבה‎, שריפה instead of the standard ברכה‎, גנבה‎, שרפה.
 Yod is often added in texts without niqqud to represent tzere in the future tense of verbs in which Yod is the first letter of the root, for example יֵשֵׁב (he will sit) is often written יישב, although the standard spelling is ישב. This spelling may also be vocalized יָשַׁב (he sat), but adding a Yod doesn't solve the ambiguity – יישב may be vocalized יְיַשֵׁב (he will settle) and יִשֵׁב (he settled). Because of the many potential ambiguities, the Academy suggests adding vocalization in such cases.
 Several other (non-comprehensive) examples:
 The standard spelling of the plural form of the word פְּרִי (fruit) is פֵּרוֹת with niqqud and פרות without niqqud, but it is often written פירות‎ (פרות may also mean פָּרוֹת  cows).
 The words אֵזוֹר (zone), הֵפֶךְ (contrary; also הֶפֶךְ‎), תֵּכֶף (immediately; also תֶּכֶף) are sometimes spelled איזור‎, היפך‎, תיכף, although the standard spelling without niqqud is אזור‎, הפך‎, תכף. (In the Even-Shoshan dictionary תיכף refers to תֶּכֶף; in the Rav-Millim dictionary it is the main entry.)

Some notable common deviations from the standard in which a Yod is not written include:
(Not writing the Yod is correct according to the old ktiv haser spelling.) For example:
 In the future, imperative and infinitive forms of verbs in binyan nif'al, the vowel of the prefix is usually , which in standard spelling without niqqud is written with a Yod: לְהִזָּהֵר (to be cautious), standard spelling without niqqud: להיזהר. This vowel changes to  before the guttural letters א‎, ה‎, ח‎, ע‎, ר‎: לְהֵרָדֵם (to fall asleep), standard spelling without niqqud: להירדם.
 In nouns of the pattern CiCCuC, such as סִפּוּק (satisfaction, without niqqud סיפוק) the vowel  also changes to  before guttural letters: פֵּרוּשׁ (commentary), תֵּאוּר (description), without niqqud: פירוש‎, תיאור, but sometimes פרוש‎, תאור.
 The Yod is sometimes omitted from words, the last letter of whose root is ה‎. This is a mistake, because in these verbs the Yod is written in texts with niqqud. For example: הוֹדֵיתִי (I thanked, root י־ד־ה‎), נֶהֱנֵינוּ (we enjoyed, root ה־נ־ה) are sometimes incorrectly spelled הודתי‎, נהננו.

Tzere with aleph and he
The letter aleph (א) is the mater lectionis after tzere in the middle or the end of the word when it is a part of the root: מוֹצֵא (finding m.), מוֹצֵאת (finding f.).

The notable example for this is the word יְפֵהפִיָּה (pretty), in which the two last letters of the root (י־פ־ה) are reduplicated. It can also be spelled יפה־פיה (fem.; so in the Bible) or יפיפיה.

The letter he (ה) is often used as a mater lectionis for the vowel  in the end of the word, but the niqqud is usually segol. It is tzere in these cases:
 In the construct state of nouns: absolute state שָׂדֶה (field), but construct state שְׂדֵה־.
 In the imperative and absolute infinitive forms of the verb: future form יְגַלֶּה (he will discover), but גַּלֵּה (discover!); future form תַּרְבֶּה (she shall increase, make many), absolute infinitive הַרְבֵּה (many).
 In some words, among them אַיֵּה (where?), אַרְיֵה (lion), הִנֵּה (here!), יָשְׁפֵה (jasper; also יָשְׁפֶה‎), ־עֶשְׂרֵה (-teen f.).

Pronunciation
The following table contains the pronunciation and transliteration of the different tzeres in reconstructed historical forms and dialects using the International Phonetic Alphabet. The pronunciation in IPA is above and the transliteration is below.

The letters Bet "ב" used in this table are only for demonstration. Any letter can be used.

Such pronunciation and transliteration of tzere are not correct in the normative pronunciation and not consistent in the spoken language.

Unicode encoding

See also
Niqqud
Segol

References

Niqqud